Stigmella irregularis is a moth of the family Nepticulidae. It has been recorded from Crete, Greece, Italy and Ukraine.

External links
Fauna Europaea

Nepticulidae
Moths of Europe
Moths described in 1994